Mayall Road is a road in Herne Hill and Brixton.  It runs parallel to Railton Road and the area between them was known in the 1970s as the Front Line - an area of troubled race relations and conflict with the police.

A street party is held there every year during the August bank holiday.

Notable residents
Darcus Howe

See also
 1981 Brixton riot

References

Streets in the London Borough of Lambeth